In the mathematical theory of Kleinian groups, the density conjecture of Lipman Bers, Dennis Sullivan, and William Thurston, later proved independently by  and , states that every finitely generated Kleinian group is an algebraic limit of geometrically finite Kleinian groups.

History

 suggested the Bers density conjecture, that singly degenerate Kleinian surface groups are on the boundary of a Bers slice. A more general version of Bers's conjecture due to Sullivan and Thurston in the late 1970s and early 1980s states that every finitely generated Kleinian group is an algebraic limit of geometrically finite Kleinian groups.  proved this for freely indecomposable Kleinian groups without parabolic elements.

References

Kleinian groups